is a railway station on the AbukumaExpress in the city of Date, Fukushima Japan.

Lines

Station layout
Yanagawa Station has a one island platform connected to the station building by a level crossing.  The station is attended.

Adjacent stations

History
Yanagawa Station opened on July 1, 1988.

Passenger statistics
In fiscal 2015, the station was used by an average of 254 passengers daily (boarding passengers only).

Surrounding area
 former Yanagawa Town Hall
Abukuma Express head office

External links

  Abukuma Express home page

References

Railway stations in Fukushima Prefecture
Abukuma Express Line
Railway stations in Japan opened in 1988
Date, Fukushima